Austrocedrus is a genus of conifer belonging to the cypress family (Cupressaceae). It has only one species, Austrocedrus chilensis, native to the Valdivian temperate rain forests and the adjacent drier steppe-forests of central-southern Chile and western Argentina from 33°S to 44°S latitude. It is known in its native area as ciprés de la cordillera or cordilleran cypress, and elsewhere by the scientific name as Austrocedrus, or sometimes as Chilean incense-cedar or Chilean cedar. The generic name means "southern cedar".

It is a member of subfamily Callitroideae, a group of distinct southern hemisphere genera associated with the Antarctic flora. It is closely related to the New Zealand and New Caledonian genus Libocedrus, and some botanists treat it within this genus, as Libocedrus chilensis, though it resembles Libocedrus less than the other South American cypress genus Pilgerodendron does.

It is a slow-growing, narrowly conical evergreen tree which grows from 10–24 m in height, with scale-like leaves arranged in decussate pairs. The leaves are unequal in size, with pairs of larger (4–8 mm) leaves alternating with pairs of smaller (2–3 mm) leaves, giving a flattened shoot. Each leaf has a prominent white stomatal stripe along the outer edge. The cones are 5–10 mm long, with four scales, two very small sterile basal scales and two large fertile scales; each fertile scale has two winged seeds 3–4 mm long. This is a dioecious species, with male and female cones growing on separate plants.

Cordilleran cypress is found in the evergreen mountain forests of the Andes, usually on drier sites within the rainforest, in open pure woods (where it is often locally dominant on the eastern slopes of the Andes in southwestern Argentina) or in association with Araucaria araucana and Nothofagus species.

It has been introduced to northwest Europe and the Pacific Northwest of North America, where it is occasionally grown in botanical gardens.

References

External links

Cupressaceae
Flora of the Andes
Flora of central Chile
Trees of Argentina
Trees of Chile
Trees of mild maritime climate
Flora of the Valdivian temperate rainforest
Monotypic conifer genera
Near threatened flora of South America
Garden plants of South America
Ornamental trees
Dioecious plants